Dichter und Bauer (Poet and Peasant) was in 1900, after composer Franz von Suppé's death, made into an operetta in 3 acts using music by him. It premiered, however, as incidental music by Suppé to a  comedy of that name on 24 August 1846 at the Theater an der Wien, in Vienna. Its overture is famous. In 1936, Gustav Quedenfeldt wrote a new libretto based on Suppé's composition version "C".

Roles 
Theophil von Salbenstein – a rich landowner
Hermine von Meyen – his ward
Ferdinand Römer – poet
Christian Berner – peasant
Lieschen – Berner's daughter
Konrad Mauer – young peasant
Barbara – a distant relative of Salbenstein

Plot summary 

The story is set in the picturesque Upper Bavaria.

Theophil von Salbenstein is a rich landowner and guardian of Hermine von Meyen who has just inherited a considerable fortune managed by him. A clause of the will, however, stipulates that in order to inherit the fortune, Hermine has either to wait for three years or to marry Salbenstein immediately. But Hermine is in love with the poet Ferdinand Römer. Ferdinand, on the other hand, has just fled to the countryside, assuming his relationship with Hermine had ended. The poet dedicates his enthusiastic and romantic poetry to Lieschen, the daughter of the peasant Christian Berner. Barbara, a distant relative of Theophil, comes on the scene to resolve the imbroglio. She manages to show Theophil a written marriage agreement. At the end, everyone gets what he or she deserves.

Plot summary based on Quedenfeldt's 1936 libretto 
In the good old days of Emperor Franz Joseph's Habsburg monarchy, the Hendelberg Marriage Market takes place every spring. Marriageable girls and fellow locals who love each other are married the same day in the chapel. Even the rich farmer Lugosch appears with his son Florian, because the old man plans to marry his simple-minded offspring with the proud Jelka, farmer Martin's daughter. However, Jelka is not in the least interested in Florian, and actually Florian is not into the idea, either, because his thoughts always revolve around the cute maid Julischka. However, the main point of contention between Lugosch and Martin is in reality the appropriation of the Steinerhof estate whose owner has recently passed away. While Lugosch wants to acquire the property for his son, Martin wishes that his ward Peter Werschitz, legitimate heir to the estate, become the new owner. But no one knows where Peter is and whether he still lives at all – and in three days the legal deadline ends, after which the Steinerhof gets under the hammer ... Then, to the astonishment of the folks, it is learned that Julischka not so long ago served as a maid at a Peter Werschitz in Budapest. The excited questioning of the girl produces even more incredible news: Peter Werschitz should be a poet! Martin, Jelka and Julischka set off for Budapest to bring Peter back home. But before the lost son becomes a real master of the Steinhof estate and a successful writer, all kinds of weird and grotesque obstacles have to be overcome between the peasants and the townspeople. But finally – without the marriage market – the right kind of love will find each other and on the Steinerhof a young couple of happiness blossoms.

In popular culture
 Mickey Mouse conducts an orchestra of barnyard animals in playing the overture of Dichter und Bauer in the 1930 short The Barnyard Concert.
 Andy Panda also conducts an orchestra of animals in the playing the overture in the 1946 short The Poet & Peasant.

References

External links

Operas based on literature
German-language operettas
Operas by Franz von Suppé
1846 operas
Operas